
The Seniors Real Estate Specialist (SRES) designation is awarded by the SRES Council to Realtors who have successfully completed coursework on the real estate needs of home buyers age 50+.

Distinctive needs, factors, and considerations for this segment of the population include:

 Housing for Older Persons Act (HOPA)
 reverse mortgages
 pensions, 401(k) accounts, and IRA
 Medicare, Medicaid, and Social Security
 mortgage finance and loan schemes and scams

History
 1997 - created by the Senior Advantage Real Estate Council
 March 2007 - recognized by the National Association of Realtors

See also
 Real estate professional designations

References

External links
 SRES Home Page

Real estate in the United States
Professional titles and certifications